Kingsley is a civil parish in the district of Staffordshire Moorlands, Staffordshire, England. It contains 46 listed buildings that are recorded in the National Heritage List for England. All the listed buildings are designated at Grade II, the lowest of the three grades, which is applied to "buildings of national importance and special interest".   The parish contains the villages of Kingsley, Kingsley Holt, and Whiston, and is otherwise rural.  Most of the listed buildings are farmhouses and farm buildings, and the other listed buildings include private houses and cottages, a church and items in the churchyard, a bridge, former lime kilns, a former workhouse converted into cottages, a milestone, and five mileposts


Buildings

References

Citations

Sources

Lists of listed buildings in Staffordshire